Lago di Posta Fibreno is an Italian lake located in Posta Fibreno, a municipality of the Province of Frosinone, Lazio. At an elevation of 288 m, its surface area is 0.287 km2.  The lake is in a karstic terrain and rich in underwater springs.

Fauna
The lake of Posta Fibreno is home of an endemic species of trout, the Fibreno trout (Salmo fibreni), along with the more widespread Mediterranean trout (Salmo cettii).

References

Lakes of Lazio